Jean Auclair (born 3 May 1946 in Vigeville) was a member of the National Assembly of France from 1989 to 2012. He represented the Creuse's 2nd constituency until its abolition and was a member of the Union for a Popular Movement.

References

1946 births
Living people
People from Creuse
Politicians from Nouvelle-Aquitaine
Rally for the Republic politicians
Union for a Popular Movement politicians
Deputies of the 12th National Assembly of the French Fifth Republic
Deputies of the 13th National Assembly of the French Fifth Republic
Candidates for the 2022 French legislative election